Platyceps najadum, also known commonly as Dahl's whip snake, the slender whip snake, and the Zagros whip snake, is a species of snake in the family Colubridae. The species is native to Eurasia. Four subspecies are recognized as being valid.

Taxonomy
P. najadum was first described by Karl Eichwald in 1831, as Tyria najadum.

Geographic range
P. najadum is found in the Balkans, Aegean, Cyprus, the Mid-East, and as far as Turkmenistan and the Caucasus Mountains.

Habitat
P. najadum occurs in dry and xeric environments in a wide range of habitats: in desert and rocky land, in forests, woodland scrub, and agricultural land from sea level to  altitude. It is commonly found in fields, and seen crushed on roads.

Description
P. najadum has a slim body, and is rarely over a metre (39 inches) in total length (including tail).

Conservation status
P. najadum is threatened by direct persecution, forest fires and intensive agriculture, where its range interacts with human interests.

Reproduction
P. najadum is an egg laying species. Females lay between 3 and 16 eggs in a clutch.

Subspecies
Four subspecies are identified, including the nominotypical subspecies.
Platyceps najadum albitemporalis 
Platyceps najadum dahlii  – Balkans, Cyprus, Aegean Turkey 
Platyceps najadum kalymnensis  – endemic to Kalymnos island, the Aegean
Platyceps najadum najadum  – Caucasus and Asia Minor

Nota bene: A trinomial authority in parentheses indicates that the subspecies was originally described in a genus other than Platyceps.

Etymology
Both the subspecific name, dahlii, and the common name, Dahl's whip snake, are in honor of Austrian entomologist Georg Dahl (1769–1831) who collected the type specimen in Dalmatia in 1824.

The subspecific name, schmidtleri, is in honor of German herpetologist Josef Friedrich Schmidtler (born 1942).

Indigenous names
Σαϊτα (Greek), Saita, Стрелушка (Bulgarian), šilac (Croatian), Za'aman Z'eitani (Hebrew), Ok Yılanı (Turkish).

References

Further reading
Arnold EN, Burton JA (1978). A Field Guide to the Reptiles and Amphibians of Britain and Europe. (Illustrated by D.W. Ovenden). London: Collins. 272 pp. + Plates 1-40. . (Coluber najadum, pp. 194–195 + Plate 35, figure 4 + Map 106).
Eichwald [K]E (1831). Zoologia specialis quam expositis animalibus tum vivis, tum fossilibus potissimum Rossiae in universum, et Poloniae in specie, in usum lectionum publicarum, in Universitate Caesarea Vilnensi [Volume 3]. Vilnius: J. Zawadzki. 404 pp. + one plate. (Tyria najadum, new species, p. 174). (in Latin).

External links
Snakes of Europe, Platyceps najadum.

Platyceps
Snakes of Asia
Reptiles of Europe
Reptiles of Central Asia
Fauna of Western Asia
Fauna of the Balkans
Fauna of the Middle East
Fauna of Cyprus
Taxa named by Karl Eichwald
Reptiles described in 1831
Reptiles of Cyprus